This is a list of compositions by Felix Blumenfeld.

Piano

Piano solo
Etude, Op. 2/1
Souvenir douloureux, Op. 2/2
Quasi Mazurka, Op. 2/3
Mazurka de concert, Op. 2/4
Three Etudes, Op. 3
Valse-etude, Op. 4
Two Nocturnes, Op. 6
Variations caractéristiques sur un thème original, Op. 8
Mazurka, Op. 10
Mazurka, Op. 11
Four Preludes, Op. 12
Two Impromptus, Op. 13
Etude ‘Sur Mer’ in G minor, Op. 14
Valse-Impromptu, Op. 16
24 Preludes, Op. 17
Nocturne-Fantasie, Op. 20
Moment de desespoir, Op. 21/1
Le Soir, Op. 21/2
Une course, Op. 21/3
Mazurka, Op. 22/1
Valse brillante, Op. 22/2
Krakowienne, Op. 23/1
À la Mazurka, Op. 23/2
Berceuse, Op. 23/3
Mazurka, Op. 23/4
Etude de concert in F♯ minor, Op. 24
Two Etude-Fantaisies, Op. 25 (No. 1 in G minor; No. 2 in E♭ minor)
Moment Lyrique, Op. 27
Impromptu, Op. 28
Two Etudes, Op. 29
Krakowiak, Op. 31/1
Kujawiak, Op. 31/2
Mazurka, Op. 31/3
Polonaise, Op. 31/4
Suite lyrique, Op. 32
Deux fragments caractéristiques, Op. 33
Ballade en forme de variations, Op. 34
Three Mazurkas, Op. 35
Etude for the left hand in A♭ Major, Op. 36

Elegie, Op. 37/1
Pathetico, Op. 37/2
Morceaux, Op. 38/1
L'île abandonnée, Op. 38/2
By the Sea, Op. 38/3
Barcarolle, Op. 38/4
Saules pleureurs, Op. 38/5
La Fontaine, Op. 38/6
Cloches, Op. 40
Zwei Klavierstücke, Op. 43
Four Etudes, Op. 44
Two Impromptus, Op. 45
Sonata-Fantasie, Op. 46
Deux fragments lyriques, Op. 47
Etude-Fantaisie in F minor, Op. 48
Deux moments dramatiques, Op. 50
Three Nocturnes, Op. 51
Episodes dans la vie d'une danseuse, Op. 52
Zwei Klavierstücke, Op. 53
Etude, Op. 54

Chamber music

Cello and piano
Elegie for Cello and Piano, Op. 19/1
Capriccioso for Cello and Piano, Op. 19/2

String quartet
String Quartet in F Major, Op. 26

Orchestra

Symphonies
Symphony in C minor ‘To the Dear Beloved’, Op. 39

Piano and orchestra
Allegro de concert for Piano and Orchestra in A major, Op. 7

Other orchestral works
Mazurka, Op. 10 (arrangement by the composer of the piano work, or vice versa)

Choral music
Sechs Chormelodien, Op. 1
Fünf Chormelodien, Op. 5
Fünf Romanzen, Op. 18
Sechs Romanzen, Op. 30

Vocal music
6 Mélodies pour Chant et Piano, Op. 9
6 Mélodies pour Chant et Piano, Op.15

External links
List of compositions (in German)

Blumenfeld, Felix
Articles containing video clips